Bogue Chitto State Park (pronounced bo-guh chit-uh) is a recent addition to the Louisiana State Park system. It opened to the public on August 28, 2010, after a delay of approximately three months.

The state park is located off Louisiana State Highway 25 south of Franklinton, in Washington Parish.  The name Bogue Chitto is from the Choctaw language, bok chito, meaning big creek.

Bogue Chitto State Park has a visitors center, a conference room, picnic pavilions, and a lodge overlooking a  bluff. Guests may stay at one of four upland cabins or park among the 81 recreational-vehicle (RV) sites. A group camp may be reserved for overnight visitors, as well. There is a canoe launch into the Bogue Chitto River, fishing piers, an amphitheater, and a water playground. The site contains eleven lakes stocked with freshwater fish. Bogue Chitto is also home to a moderately difficult 18 hole disc golf course, winding through hilly wooded terrain.

Notable physical features are small streams, cypress-tupelo swamps, and both upland and bottomland hardwood forests. Of particular interest is a gorge known as Fricke's Cave, which contains delicate sandstone formations.

The park's address is 17049 State Park Boulevard, Franklinton, Louisiana.

See also
List of Louisiana state parks

References

External links

Bogue Chitto State Park

State parks of Louisiana
Protected areas of Washington Parish, Louisiana